The Battle of Beauharnois was fought on November 10, 1838, between Lower Canada loyalists and Patriote rebels, after 500 armed men had converged on Beauharnois, on November 3–4, overtaking the seigneurial manor.

The seigneury of Beauharnois belonged to the Ellice family, having, in 1796, purchased it from Michel Chartier de Lotbinière, Marquis de Lotbinière. Edward Ellice, private secretary to John Lambton, 1st Earl of Durham, had then been in residence for several months. He, and, separately, his wife, Lady Jane Ellice, and her sister, Eglantine "Tina" Balfour, later Ellice, were taken prisoner, along with a number of others. Ellice's watercolours, sketches and diary survived, and record that they were unharmed.

The town rose up, following a series of raids by rebel leaders who had escaped into the United States. François-Marie-Thomas Chevalier de Lorimier commanded the ranks of the Patriote rebels. The British were victorious, and 108 rebels were captured and tried in Montreal. 58 of the Patriote rebels were deported to Australia, while Lorimier was hanged.

Government forces burned several buildings in the area in reprisal for the rebels’ actions.

References

See also 
Lower Canada Rebellion

Beauharnois
Beauharnois, Battle of
Beauharnois
1838 in Lower Canada
November 1838 events